Denis Grabe (born February 22, 1990, in Tallinn, Estonia), is an Estonian professional pool player. Grabe reached the quarter-final of the 2016 WPA World Nine-ball Championship, before losing to Cheng Yu-hsuan 11–3. Grabe won two consecutive Euro Tour tournaments in a row in 2014, at the Austria Open, and Slovenian Open. In 2018, he also reached the final of the 2018 Sankt Johann im Pongau Open, losing the final 9–5 to Alexander Kazakis.

Accomplishments
 2019 Euro Tour Antalya Open 
 2018 World Pool Series 9-Ball Championship 
 2014 Euro Tour Austria Open 
 2014 Euro Tour Slovenian Open

References

External links
 Denis Grabe at AZBilliards

1990 births
Living people
Estonian pool players
Sportspeople from Tallinn